AC Semassi F.C. is a Togolese football club based in Sokodé. They play in the top division in Togolese football. Their home stadium is Stade Municipal.

Achievements
Togolese Championnat National: 10
1978, 1979, 1981, 1982, 1983, 1993, 1994, 1995, 1999, 2014

Coupe du Togo: 3
1980 ,1982, 1990

Performance in CAF competitions
 African Cup of Champions Clubs: 7 appearances
1980: Second Round
1982: First Round
1983: First Round
1984: Semi-Finals
1994: First Round
1995: First Round
1996: First Round

CAF Cup: 1 appearance
2000 – First Round

CAF Cup Winners' Cup: 3 appearances
1981 – Second Round
1991 – First Round
1993 – Second Round

Football clubs in Togo
Football clubs in Sokodé